The 1952 British Grand Prix was a Formula Two race held on 19 July 1952 at Silverstone Circuit. It was race 5 of 8 in the 1952 World Championship of Drivers, in which each Grand Prix was run to Formula Two rules rather than the Formula One regulations normally used.

New pit facilities had been built on the straight between Woodcote and Copse corners; the original pits were located between Abbey and Woodcote.

Report
Jean Behra was unable to take part in the British Grand Prix, having broken his shoulder blade at the non-championship Grand Prix de Sables d'Olonne the previous weekend. Consequently, Maurice Trintignant took over Behra's Gordini T16 for Silverstone, having driven a Simca-Gordini T15 at Rouen-Les-Essarts. The Gordini team also fielded regular drivers Robert Manzon and Prince Bira. As in the previous race, Belgian driver Johnny Claes entered a privateer Simca-Gordini under the 'Ecurie Belge' moniker. Ferrari stuck with the same three drivers — Alberto Ascari, Nino Farina and Piero Taruffi — who had monopolised the podium positions at the French Grand Prix. There were also a number of privateer Ferrari entrants: Fischer and Hirt for Ecurie Espadon, Peter Whitehead and Roy Salvadori. HWM continued their policy of partnering regulars Peter Collins and Lance Macklin with a local driver, in this case Duncan Hamilton. The Connaught team ran a quartet of Lea Francis-engined entries — McAlpine, Downing, Thompson and Poore — while the remainder of the grid was made up of a series of privateers of various constructors, including Coopers and Maseratis.

The three works Ferraris, led on this occasion by Farina, again qualified in the top three positions on the grid, this time being joined on the four-car front row by Manzon. The second row consisted of Downing alongside Reg Parnell and Mike Hawthorn in a pair of Cooper-Bristols. The Connaughts of Poore and Thompson shared row three with Bira's Gordini and Hamilton in his HWM.

Ascari took the lead at the start of the race and held onto it for the whole 85 laps, taking his third consecutive victory in the World Championship. Polesitter Nino Farina was in second place for the first 26 laps but he dropped down the field when he needed to pit to change spark plugs, eventually finishing in sixth, just outside the points. Despite making a bad start that saw him drop to ninth by the end of the first lap, fellow Ferrari driver Taruffi recovered to take second place, finishing a lap behind Ascari. Dennis Poore, who had been running in third after Farina's pit stop, needed to make a stop of his own in order to refuel his car. This allowed Hawthorn to inherit third place, which he held for the remainder of the race. He finished a lap behind Taruffi and took his first World Championship podium in just his third race. Poore took fourth, ahead of Connaught teammate Eric Thompson in the fifth and final points position.

Ascari's win, coupled with yet another fastest lap, allowed him to extend his lead in the Drivers' Championship once again. He now enjoyed an eight-point lead over fellow Ferrari driver Taruffi. Farina, having not scored any points, was seven points adrift of Taruffi.

Entries

 — Roy Salvadori qualified and drove the entire race in the #14 Ferrari. Bobbie Baird, named substitute driver for the car, was not used during the Grand Prix.
 — Louis Rosier and Ken Wharton both withdrew from the event prior to practice.

Classification

Qualifying

Race

Notes
 – Includes 1 point for fastest lap

Championship standings after the race
Drivers' Championship standings

Note: Only the top five positions are included. Only the best 4 results counted towards the Championship.

References

British Grand Prix
British Grand Prix
Grand Prix
Brit